The Collective Redundancies Directive 98/59/EC is an EU Directive concerning the procedures and warnings that any employer is under a duty to its workforce to follow if it finds it necessary to make more than 20 employees redundant over 90 days (or 10 to 30 employees depending on the size of the firm over 30 days if the member state chooses this option).

Content
The Directive sets a minimum standard for information and consultation with workers in the event that a significant number of workers are affected by proposed redundancies.

See also

UK labour law
European labour law

External links
 Council Directive 98/59/EC of 20 July 1998 on the approximation of the laws of the Member States relating to collective redundancies
 National execution measures of Directive 98/59/EC

United Kingdom labour law
European Union directives
1998 in law
1998 in the European Union
1998 in labor relations